St Columban's College is an independent Catholic systemic secondary day school for boys and girls, located in Caboolture, Queensland, Australia. Founded by the Congregation of Christian Brothers in 1928, co-educational school has been run via the Catholic Education Office of the Archdiocese of Brisbane since 1986.

The campus moved to Caboolture in 1997 from the original college site at Albion due to changing demographics of that inner-Brisbane suburban area.

History
St. Columban's was established by the Congregation of Christian Brothers in 1928 at Albion as a school for boys. St Columban's College commenced as another practical outreach by the Congregation of the Christian Brothers, in providing readily accessible education for young boys. The college developed a working-class identity with strong patronage from the racing fraternity, reaching a maximum enrolment of some 850 boys from Years 5 to 12 during the 1980s. Always supported by an active parental group, the college thrived through the 1960s and 1970s, being associated with some well-known Brisbane events, including the Colana Carnival. Parents built by hand the college swimming pool and worked tirelessly to raise funds for construction of many buildings to add to the opportunities offered to its students.

Throughout its history the college gained a reputation for having a strong identity in sport, with its students being called upon to ‘have a go’. St Columban's College is the only founding member of The Associated Schools association, established in 1947, which continues to compete in the competition. In 1985 the Congregation of the Christian Brothers formally handed the college over to the Archdiocese of Brisbane. Shortly after, the primary school was phased out with the college offering secondary education focused between Years 8 to 12. The first lay principal, Peter Crombie, took up his appointment in 1985. Three Christian Brothers stayed on teaching during this year.

In 1988 and 1989 the intake for Year 8 slowly dropped. Michael Harkin, the second lay principal, attempted to stem the loss of enrolments that followed during these ensuing years. Despite these efforts, the drop in numbers became steady and continuous. In 1989 number had dropped to 425 students when only 15 years earlier, numbers were at 800. In 1995 a decision was made to relocate a financially unviable college campus to Caboolture. Preparation commenced for a new co-educational campus with an inventory created of how and what to move from a college in order to preserve its best qualities.

Notable alumni

 Andrew Bartlettpolitician, former Australian Democrats and Greens Senator for Queensland
 Peter Bonnerartist, winner Dobell Prize for drawing
 Brandon BorrelloAustralian soccer player
 Trevor Gillmeisterrugby league player for Queensland Maroons and Australian Kangaroos
 Ronan Leeformer Member of Parliament and Queensland Parliamentary Secretary
 Rod McCallrugby union player for Queensland Reds and Australian Wallabies
 Lakeisha Pattersonswimmer who competed in the Paralympic Games
 Michael PutneyBishop of Townsville; 6th President of the National Council of Churches in Australia
 Taylah Robertsonboxer, bronze medalist at the 2018 Commonwealth Games
 Luke Williamsonrugby league player for Adelaide, Canberra, and Manly

See also

 Catholic education in Australia
 List of schools in Queensland

References

External links
St. Columban's College

High schools in Queensland
Educational institutions established in 1928
Catholic secondary schools in Queensland
Schools in South East Queensland
1928 establishments in Australia
The Associated Schools member schools
Former Congregation of Christian Brothers schools in Australia
Roman Catholic Archdiocese of Brisbane